The Ihlara Valley (or Peristrema Valley; Turkish Ihlara Vadisi) is a canyon which is 15 km long and up to 150 m deep in the southwest of the Turkish region of Cappadocia, in the municipality of Güzelyurt, Aksaray Province. The valley contains around 50 rock-hewn churches and numerous rock-cut buildings.

Etymology 
The earlier Greek name, Peristrema (Περιστρημα; winding round) of the village of Belisarma which is located about halfway along the valley from Ihlara to Selime, gave its name to the valley as well.

Development and location 

The canyon was formed in prehistoric times by the Melendiz River. It lies between the villages of Ihlara in the southeast and Selime in the northwest. At the north end of the village of Ihlara, there is a stairway with almost 400 steps, which descends over 100 m down into the canyon. From the 7th century AD, the valley was settled by Byzantine monks who dug their houses and churches out of the tuff stone, which had been deposited by the eruptions of Mount Hasan.

Churches 
The churches in the valley fall into two groups. The first consists of the churches near the village of Ihlara, which are decorated with paintings of a local Cappadocian type that show influence from Persia and Syria to the east. They mostly pre-date the Iconoclasm, but were often repainted in newer styles over time. The second group is located near the village of Belisarma and consists of churches in the Byzantine style of the tenth and eleventh centuries, known as Macedonian art. 

The first group includes:
 Ağaçaltı Kilisesi ('Church under the Tree'): also known as "Daniel Pantonassa Church", a cross-in-square church cut out of the cliff,  perhaps dating to the 7th century AD. The depiction of the Ascension in its cupola pre-dates the Iconoclasm. 
 Yılanlı Kilise ('Snake Church'): possibly dedicated to Helena Augusta, the mother of Constantine I, another cross-in-square church with an unusually long apse. In the narthex there are scenes of Hell dating to the 9th century AD, and below them are four naked sinners in the grip of snake-like monsters - from which the church takes its modern name.
 Sümbüllü Kilise ('Hyacinth church'): also known as "Jacinth Church" possibly from the 10th century AD. The church has a T-shaped ground plan and belongs to the transition to the Macedonian style. The wall paintings include depictions of Constantine VII with his wife Helena. On the other hand, the external facade shows eastern influences.
 Kokar Kilise, also known as 'Church of Andrew in Cynocephalia'.
 Eğritaş Kilisesi ('Curved Stone Church'): possibly dedicated to Nikolaos Oikonomides and formerly known as (N. Oikonomidès), It is thought that Eğritaş Church was built before the Iconoclast (726-843) and is one of the early and large churches of the valley.
 Pürenli Seki Church: The church consists of four halls carved into the rock.
 Karanlık Kale Kilisesi ('Dark Castle Church'): It was carved into the rock as a monastery church. 9-10 of the church, which has no frescoes. It is estimated that it was built in the middle of the 11th century or the middle of the 11th century.

The second group includes:
 Direkli Kilise ('Pillar church'). The cruciform nave church was created in the 10th century AD. The cupola is supported by four tall columns, which are decorated with portraits of saints. One of the few inscriptions in the valley reports the dedication of the church by the Byzantine emperor Basil II (r. 976-1025).
 Karagedik Kilisesi ('Church with the Black Gap', also called 'St. Ermolaos Church'). a cross-in-square church with four pillars, which was built from bricks and trachyte blocks in the 11th century and has been almost entirely destroyed aside from some faded remains of paintings.
 Kırkdamaltı Kilisesi ('Church with forty roofs', also called 'St George's Church'). An inscription allows the church to be dated between 1283 and 1295, which makes it the last known example of Christian architecture in the Ihlara valley until the revival of church building by the Cappadocian Greeks in the 19th century. The church's paintings include depictions of St George, a painting of the Byzantine consul Basileos Giagupes, who was also an Emir and is shown in Seljuk clothing with his wife Thamar, a Georgian princess. The aforementioned inscription mentions both the Seljuk Sultan Mesud II and the Byzantine emperor Andronikos II Palaiologos, a sign that at this date some kind of peaceful co-existence between Christians and Muslims was possible in Cappadocia. 
 Bahattin Samanlığı Kilise
 Bezirhane Complex - a rock-cut complex with a built in church.
 Ala Kilise ('Superb church'). 
 Meryem Ana Kilisesi ('Virgin Mary Church'), near the Selime cathedral.

In the Niğde Archaeological Museum, there is a display of the mummies of a woman and four children who were entombed in the Ihlara Valley in the 10th century AD. The Aksaray Museum also has mummies from the Ihlara valley.

Gallery

See also 
 Rock-cut architecture of Cappadocia

References

Bibliography 
 Peter Daners, Volker Ohl: Kappadokien. Dumont, 1996, 
 Marianne Mehling (ed.): Knaurs Kulturführer in Farbe Türkei. Droemer-Knaur, München 1987, .
 Robert G. Ousterhout: A Byzantine Settlement in Cappadocia.Dumbarton Oaks, 2005, on Google Books

Weblinks 

 exploreturkey with map of the valley
 About ihlara valley and ihlara konaklari
Valleys of Turkey
Cappadocia
Landforms of Aksaray Province